Mukha may refer to:

Mukha (1958 film), a Pakistani film
Mukha (TV series), a Philippine television drama
Mukha (game) or makha, a form of traditional Pashtun archery
Museum of Modern Art, Antwerp, formerly known as MuKHA
Mocha, Yemen, sometimes spelled Mukha

See also
 
 Mucha